Sassandra Airport  is an airport serving Sassandra, Côte d'Ivoire.

See also
Transport in Côte d'Ivoire

References

 OurAirports - Sassandra
 Great Circle Mapper - Sassandra
 Google Earth

Airports in Ivory Coast
Buildings and structures in Bas-Sassandra District
Gbôklé